Allocasuarina scleroclada is a shrub of the genus Allocasuarina native to a small area along the south coast in the Great Southern and Goldfields-Esperance regions of Western Australia.

It is found in granitic or lateritic soils and limestone shelves near the ocean.

References

External links
  Occurrence data for Allocasuarina scleroclada from The Australasian Virtual Herbarium

scleroclada
Rosids of Western Australia
Fagales of Australia
Dioecious plants